Utánpótlás Kézilabda Sport Egyesület Szekszárd is a Hungarian women's handball team from Szekszárd.

History 
The club was created in 1995 with about 40 players. During the early years the club grew quickly, and for today more than 150 players in ten groups of age are trained by twenty coaches. Most of the players are between the age of 8 and 18, as the main pillar of the team is the youth development and promotion of home-grown players. For their work with juveniles, UKSE were awarded the "A Magyar Kézilabdázásért" ("For the Hungarian Handball") prize in 2006.

Their biggest success so far is the third place in the Nemzeti Bajnokság I/B, they achieved in 2010. This result unexpectedly became more valuable later, as Hódmezővásárhelyi NKC were unable to meet the financial criteria to enter the 2010–11 Nemzeti Bajnokság I, and UKSE, with the best balance between the non-promoted teams, got the chance to take their place in the top-level championship.

Results 
Nemzeti Bajnokság I/B
Bronze: 2010

Notable former players 

  Ágnes Triffa
  Luca Szekerczés
  Edit Csendes
  Margit Pádár
  Ninoslava Popov
  Jasmina Petrovic

See also 
 2011–12 Nemzeti Bajnokság I (women's handball)

References

External links 
 Official website of UKSE Szekszárd
 History and club manifesto

Hungarian handball clubs
Handball clubs established in 1995
1995 establishments in Hungary
Tolna County